WebGeSTer DB is a database of intrinsic transcription terminators

See also
 Intrinsic termination

References

External links
 http://pallab.serc.iisc.ernet.in/gester

Biological databases
Gene expression
Molecular biology